(September 28, 1721 – September 25, 1780) was a Japanese daimyō of the Edo period, who ruled the Tokushima Domain. His court title was Awa no kami.

Family
 Father: Matsudaira Yorihiro (1700-1737)
 Mother: Sano-dono
 Wife: Motohime (d.1742), daughter of Hachisuka Yoshitake
 Concubines:
 Kume-dono
 Kose-dono
 Unknown
 Children:
 Daughter by Motohime
 Ishimatsu by Kume-dono
 Yoshiko married Sanjo Saneoki by Kose-dono
 Yonosuke by Kose-dono
 daughter by Kose-dono
 Hachisuka Yoshimitsu (1769-1812)
 Daughter by Unknown
 Daughter by Unknown
 Daughter by Unknown
 Kamechiyo by Unknown

References

1721 births
1780 deaths
Daimyo
Hachisuka clan